Eleutherodactylus albipes is a species of frog in the family Eleutherodactylidae endemic to Cuba. Its natural habitat is subtropical or tropical moist montane forest.
It is threatened by habitat loss.

References

albipes
Endemic fauna of Cuba
Amphibians of Cuba
Amphibians described in 1937
Taxonomy articles created by Polbot
Taxa named by Thomas Barbour
Taxa named by Benjamin Shreve